Shifflett is a surname. Notable people with the surname include:

Garland Shifflett (1935–2020), American baseball player
John Shifflett (1953–2017), American jazz musician
Steve Shifflett (born 1966), American baseball player